Starting Over is a 1979 American comedy film based on Dan Wakefield's 1973 novel, produced by James L. Brooks, and directed by Alan J. Pakula. Starring Burt Reynolds, Jill Clayburgh, and Candice Bergen, it follows a recently divorced man who is torn between his new girlfriend and his ex-wife.

It was nominated for two Academy Awards for Best Actress in a Leading Role (Clayburgh) and Best Actress in a Supporting Role (Bergen). Marvin Hamlisch and Carole Bayer Sager wrote three original songs for the film, "Easy for You," "Better Than Ever", and "Starting Over", which are sung by Bergen live in the film as she is creating them but sung by Stephanie Mills for their radio versions.

Plot
Phil Potter (Burt Reynolds) splits with his wife, Jessica (Candice Bergen). She wants to be a singer/songwriter and has been having an affair.

Phil moves from New York City to Boston, where his brother Mickey (Charles Durning) and his sister-in-law Marva (Frances Sternhagen) live. Against his wishes, they set him up with a blind date, Marilyn Holmberg (Jill Clayburgh), a nursery-school teacher working on her master's degree.

He begins a new life. Phil takes a part-time teaching job and attends a divorced-men workshop in a church basement, meeting lonely men like Paul and Larry whose situations are similar to his. Marilyn feels it's too soon following his breakup for Phil to begin a new relationship. He goes on a date with her friend Marie, a single mom who literally throws herself at him.

At a family Thanksgiving dinner, a phone call from Jessica comes at an inopportune time. Marilyn overhears him telling Jessie that he is dining with his family and "their friend." Marilyn's feelings are hurt and wants to end the relationship. He confronts Marilyn at a school carnival, where she is staffing a "Dunk the Teacher" dunk tank, and after dunking her several times, Phil asks her to "define" their relationship. Finally, Marilyn agrees when Phil invites her to move in with him. Soon after they move in together, Jessica unexpectedly turns up at his apartment. She looks fabulous and has become a great success as a songwriter, although she is a decidedly off-key singer.

Phil moves back to New York City to be with Jessica again. But the more he is with her, the more he misses Marilyn. He returns to Boston only to find she is now dating a basketball player. Phil does everything he can, even disrupting a Boston Celtics practice, in an attempt to win her back.

Cast

Reception
Roger Ebert gave the film 2 stars out of 4 and wrote that it "feels sort of embarrassed at times, maybe because characters are placed in silly sitcom situations and then forced to say lines that are supposed to be revealing and real." Gene Siskel of the Chicago Tribune gave the film 3 stars out of 4 and said it was worth seeing because "Two-thirds of it (Reynolds and Clayburgh) work very well," though he disliked Candice Bergen, saying "she is awful in this picture" and that the script "somehow feels obliged to be cute or funny. We don't want jokes from 'Starting Over.' All we want is to see Reynolds and Clayburgh go out together and work on their problems." Variety called the film "a delight. Much more than the flip side of An Unmarried Woman, to which it will inevitably be compared, the James L. Brook (sic) production takes on the subject of marital dissolution from a comic point of view, and succeeds admirably." Charles Champlin of the Los Angeles Times declared, "It is, all in all, a classy entertainment which, right now and in years to come, will remind us quite accurately how things were between middle-class men and women, circa 1980." Jack Kroll of Newsweek stated that the film "starts out well and continues well for about two-thirds of the way before succumbing to the creeping virus of the cutesies. But until then, Pakula finds a nice groove of effectively understated comedy." Frank Rich said in Time, "Though this film has funny lines and a potentially explosive story, it rarely generates any emotion beyond bland good cheer. Right up to the moment that Starting Over is over, we are still waiting for the fireworks to start." Gary Arnold of The Washington Post wrote, "As the newly divorced hero of 'Starting Over,' a delightful romantic comedy destined for enormous well-deserved popularity, Burt Reynolds reaches a breathtaking new plateau of screen acting dexterity."

References

External links
 
 

1979 films
1979 romantic comedy films
American romantic comedy films
1970s English-language films
Films scored by Marvin Hamlisch
Films based on American novels
Films directed by Alan J. Pakula
Films set in Boston
Films set in New York City
Films with screenplays by James L. Brooks
Paramount Pictures films
Films about divorce
1970s American films